Sichan (also Romanized as Sīchān; also known as Sīchāh) is a village in Fasharud Rural District, in the Central District of Birjand County, South Khorasan Province, Iran. At the 2016 census, its population was 72, in 30 families.

References 

Populated places in Birjand County